Hookipa is a board game published in 1986 by Activé Games.

Contents
Hookipa is a game in which there are two games, one on each side of the board: the first consists of racing miniature sailboards around marker buoys, while on the other side of the board is Hookipa Bay where the boards race around six buoys.

Reception
John Humphries reviewed Hookipa for Games International magazine, and gave it 3 stars out of 5, and stated that "the game is likely to appeal more to the aficionados of the sport rather than to your average landlubber."

References

Board games introduced in 1986